Summer's Coming may refer to:

Songs
Sumer Is Icumen In (also called the Summer Canon and the Cuckoo Song) a medieval English rota of the mid-13th Century
Summer's Comin' (Clint Black song) 
"Summer's Coming", single by Fred (band) 2005
"Summer's Coming", B-side to Everyone's Gone to the Moon by Jonathan King from the album Everyone's Gone To The Moon
"Summer's Coming", song by Sean Watkins from Blinders On
"Summer's Comin'", song by Ronnie Dawson (musician)	1960
"Summer Is Coming", song by Labi Siffre from The Singer and the Song
"Summer Is Coming", song by Matt Pond PA from The Nature of Maps